KBPX-LD (channel 46) is a low-power television station in Houston, Texas, United States. The station is owned by the Word Broadcasting Network. KBPX-LD's transmitter is located atop the JPMorgan Chase Tower in downtown Houston.

History
The station began broadcasting in 1990 from One Shell Plaza on channel 33 under the call sign K33DB as a low-powered translator for Conroe-licensed KTFH (channel 49, renamed KPXB-TV in 1998), in order to improve KTFH's analog coverage in Houston since its full-power analog transmitter site was located in the far northern suburbs of Houston. The transmitter was moved to the Missouri City tower farm in 1992. The call sign was changed to KBPX-LP on April 25, 2001.

The translator was shut down on June 30, 2009, two weeks after the digital transition, due to loss of access to the tower site. Ion Media applied to move KBPX-LP to channel 46, but since the full-power KPXB-TV now broadcasts from Missouri City (which was KBPX's former transmitter location), it was unclear what purpose the translator would serve. KBPX-LD resumed operations November 22, 2010 on digital channel 46, carrying The Country Network.

On December 21, 2017, Ion agreed to donate KBPX-LD to the Word Broadcasting Network; the donation was completed on February 16, 2018.

Technical information

Subchannels
The station's digital signal is multiplexed:

References

BPX-LD
Television channels and stations established in 1990
Low-power television stations in the United States
1990 establishments in Texas
The Country Network affiliates
NewsNet affiliates
Heartland (TV network) affiliates